Charles Hand Geer (August 25, 1922 – December 7, 2008) was an American illustrator of children's books, two of which he wrote. He also designed numerous book jackets.

Geer grew up on Long Island, New York, attended Dartmouth College in New Hampshire, and then served in the United States Navy during World War II. Following the war he attended art school at the Pratt Institute.

Many of the buildings in his illustrations feature Second Empire architecture, with their characteristic mansard roofs.

Geer lived until his death in 2008 in Rockland, Maine, where he enjoyed sailing and painting watercolors.  Over the years he built several boats.

Selected works

As illustrator 
 Game of Statues by Anne Stevenson
 Schoolboy Johnson by John R. Tunis
 Mystery at Redtop Hill, by Marjory Schwalje, 1965
 The Mad Scientists' Club, by Bertrand R. Brinley
 The New Adventures of the Mad Scientists' Club, by Bertrand R. Brinley
 The Big Kerplop, by Bertrand R. Brinley
 The Big Chunk of Ice, by Bertrand R. Brinley
 The Marvelous Inventions of Alvin Fernald, by Clifford B. Hicks
 Miss Pickerell on the Moon, by Dora F. Pantell
 Miss Pickerell and the Weather Satellite, by Dora F. Pantell
 Miss Pickerell and the Blue Whales, by Dora F. Pantell
 Miss Pickerell and the War of the Computers, by Dora F. Pantell
 Miss Pickerell and the Lost World, by Dora F. Pantell
 Wild Geese Flying, by Cornelia Meigs
 That Summer With Lexy!, by Audrey McKim
 McNulty's Holiday, by Rutherford Montgomery
 Sauncey and Mr. King's Gallery,  by Clara Ann Simmons
 The Biggest (and Best) Flag That Ever Flew,  by Rebecca C. Jones, 1988
The Story of Dwight D. Eisenhower, by Arthur J. Beckhard, 1956
Katie Kittenheart by Miriam E. Mason. Macmillan, 1957.
 Lost in the Barrens by Farley Mowat
 Sandro's Battle,  by David Scott Daniell, 1962 (jacket only)
 The Pipe Organ in the Parlour, by Lilla Stirling, 1960
 Secret Under Antarctica, by Gordon R. Dickson
 The Secret Raft, by Hazel Krantz
 Plain Girl, by Virginia Sorensen
 Gretchen of Grand Pré, by Lilla Stirling
 "The Lonely Mound," by William Campbell Gault (cover illustrator)

As author 
 Dexter and the Deer Lake Mystery (1965)
 Soot Devil (1971)
 The Pipe Organ in the Parlour (also by Lilla Stirling, 1960)

References

External links 

 Happy 85th, Charles Geer! (Illustrator, "The Mad Scientists' Club" by Bertrand Brinley)
 familysearch.org — U.S. Social Security Death Index for Charles H Geer
 
 
 
 

 https://www.facebook.com/CharlesGeerillustrator/?fref=ts

American illustrators
2008 deaths
1922 births
20th-century American male writers
Dartmouth College alumni
United States Navy personnel of World War II
Pratt Institute alumni